Brackenville is an unincorporated community in New Castle County, Delaware, United States. Brackenville is located at the intersection of Brackenville Road and Old Wilmington Road, east of Hockessin.

In 1809, William Brackend bought land along the road running from Wilmington to Lancaster. With the  opening of the Wilmington Turnpike (Lancaster Pike) in 1818, he opened a hotel named the "Peace and Plenty". The hotel stood on the northwest corner of Old Lancaster Pike and Brackenville Road; it was demolished before 1937.

References 

Unincorporated communities in New Castle County, Delaware
Unincorporated communities in Delaware